The 2004 Munster Senior Hurling Championship Final was a hurling match played on 27 June 2004 at Semple Stadium, Thurles, County Tipperary. It was contested by Cork and Waterford. Waterford claimed their second Munster Championship of the decade, beating Cork on a scoreline of 3-16 to 1-21, a 1 point winning margin. Overall, this was Waterford's seventh Munster Senior Hurling Championship. The final, which swung both ways numerous times, including numerous goals and a sending off, is considered one of the greatest Munster Hurling Finals of all time.
In Ireland, the match was televised live on the Sunday Game on RTÉ Two with commentary from Ger Canning and Michael Duignan.

Previous Munster Final encounters
Previous to this encounter, the teams had met each other in twelve Munster Hurling Finals, including a replay in 1931.  Cork lead the rivalry having won eight finals in comparison to Waterford's three wins.  Notable finals include 1982 when Cork beat Waterford by 31 points (Munster Final record) and in the previous year's final when Cork beat Waterford by 4 points even after a hat trick of goals by Waterford's John Mullane.

Match details

See also
 Cork–Waterford hurling rivalry

References

External links
 Match Details at Hurlingstats.com

Munster
Munster Senior Hurling Championship Finals
Cork county hurling team matches
Waterford GAA matches